Anupam Chander is the Scott K Ginsburg Professor of Law at Georgetown University Law Center and an expert on the global regulation of new technologies. Chander's scholarship has appeared in the Yale Law Journal, the California Law Review, and the American Journal of International Law, among other legal publications, and his research has been featured in news stories by Business Insider, CNN, NPR, and Forbes.

Education and Previous Work 
Chander received his B.A. from Harvard University. He received his J.D. from Yale Law School in 1992. After graduating, Chander served as a law clerk for Chief Judge Jon O. Newman of the Second Circuit Court of Appeals and Judge William A. Norris of the Ninth Circuit Court of Appeals. He has practiced law with Cleary, Gottlieb, Steen & Hamilton both locally, in New York, and internationally, in Hong Kong. Prior to his current position, Chander was a Professor of Law at the UC Davis School of Law and the director of the California International Law Center.

Academic Publications 
Chander is the author of numerous law review articles and has written three books: The Electronic Silk Road (2013), Internet Law: Statutory Supplement (2019), and Fred Korematsu: All American Hero (2011) with co-author Madhavi Sunder. He also edited Securing Privacy in the Internet Age (2008) with co-editors Lauren Gelman and Margaret Jane Radin.

The Electronic Silk Road has been reviewed by several academics and is regarded as an interesting, balanced, and important contribution to discussion on internet law, international trade and globalization studies.

Public Scholarship 
Chander often appears in the media to discuss current issues pertaining to the regulation of technology. In 2020, Chander was quoted in articles by Business Insider, CNN and Forbes regarding proposals by the Trump Administration to ban TikTok from the United States over national security and data privacy concerns. Chander wrote an opinion piece for the Washington Post on this issue and also appeared as a guest on NPR's Planet Money podcast.

Grants and Awards 
In 2014, Professor Chander received a Google Faculty Research Award for his research in policy and standards.  In the same year, Chander and other University of California scholars received a grant of $175,000 from the Andrew W. Mellon Foundation to lead a Sawyer Seminar titled  "Surveillance Democracies?" at University of California at Davis.

References 

Georgetown University Law Center faculty
UC Davis School of Law faculty
Harvard College alumni
Yale Law School alumni
Year of birth missing (living people)
Living people
Place of birth missing (living people)